Jessee’s Mill is a historic grist mill located near Cleveland, Russell County, Virginia. The original section was built about 1850, as a single pen log structure.  About 1890, a two-story balloon frame addition was built on top of the old log structure. The mill retains much of its original milling equipment. Also located on the property are the contributing mill dam (c. 1850) and a frame barn.  The mill remained in operation until 1932.

It was listed on the National Register of Historic Places in 2005.

References

Grinding mills in Virginia
Grinding mills on the National Register of Historic Places in Virginia
Industrial buildings completed in 1890
Buildings and structures in Russell County, Virginia
National Register of Historic Places in Russell County, Virginia